Tribbett is a surname. Notable people with the surname include:

Derrick Tribbett (born 1984), American musician (stage names Tripp Lee and Sinister)
Greg Tribbett (born 1968), guitarist & backing vocalist for American band Mudvayne, and supergroup Hellyeah
Ken Tribbett (born 1992), American soccer (football) player
Tye Tribbett (born 1976), American gospel music singer, songwriter, keyboardist, choir director

See also
Tribbett, Mississippi, unincorporated community located in Washington County, Mississippi
Tribble
Triblet
Trivet